Thompkins may refer to:

Brandon Thompkins (born 1987), arena football wide receiver
Carlotta J. Thompkins (1844–1934), 19th century Texas gambler known as Lottie Deno
DeAndre Thompkins (born 1995), American football player
Deven Thompkins (born 1999), American football player
Gerry Thompkins (born 1937), Canadian football player
Kenbrell Thompkins (born 1988), American football wide receiver
Kendal Thompkins (born 1989), American Football wide receiver
Leslie Thompkins, fictional character in comic books, associated with Batman
Russell Thompkins of The Stylistics, soul music vocal group in Philadelphia
Trey Thompkins (born 1990), American professional basketball player
William H. Thompkins (1872–1916), Buffalo Soldier in the United States Army
William J. Thompkins (1884–1944), physician and health administrator in Kansas City, Missouri

See also
Tomkins (disambiguation)
Tompkins (disambiguation)